Bathymargarites symplector is a species of extremely small deep water sea snail, a marine gastropod mollusk in the family Seguenziidae.

References

 Williams S.T., Karube S. & Ozawa T. (2008) Molecular systematics of Vetigastropoda: Trochidae, Turbinidae and Trochoidea redefined. Zoologica Scripta 37: 483–506.

External links
 To Barcode of Life (1 barcode)
 To Biodiversity Heritage Library (2 publications)
 To Encyclopedia of Life
 To GenBank (11 nucleotides; 2 proteins)
 To USNM Invertebrate Zoology Mollusca Collection
 To World Register of Marine Species

symplector
Gastropods described in 1989